The L. D. Landau Institute for Theoretical Physics of the Russian Academy of Sciences is a research institution, located in the small town of Chernogolovka near Moscow (there is also a subdivision in Moscow, on the territory of the P. L. Kapitza Institute for Physical Problems).

History

The Landau Institute was formed in 1964 to keep the Landau school alive after the tragic car accident of Lev D. Landau. Since its foundation, the institute grew rapidly to about one hundred scientists, becoming one of the worldwide best-known and leading institutes for theoretical physics.

Unlike many other scientific centers in Russia, the Landau Institute had the strength to cope with the crisis of the nineties in the last century. Although about one half of the scientists accepted positions at leading scientific centers and universities abroad, most of them kept ties with their home institute, forming a scientific network in the tradition of the Landau school and supporting young theoretical physicists in the Landau Institute.

Prominent members

Up to 1992, the institute was headed by Isaak Markovich Khalatnikov, who was then replaced by Vladimir E. Zakharov. Its numerous prominent scientists, mathematicians as well as physicists, include the Nobel laureate Alexei Alexeyevich Abrikosov as well as Igor Dzyaloshinsky, Lev Gor'kov, Vladimir Gribov, Arkady Migdal, Anatoly Larkin, Sergei Novikov, Alexander Polyakov, Mark Azbel, Valery Pokrovsky, Emmanuel Rashba, Sergey Iordanskii, Ioshua Levinson, Alexei Starobinsky, Alexei Kitaev, Vadim Berezinskii (whose early death prevented him from sharing the Nobel Prize for the Berezinskii–Kosterlitz–Thouless transition theory), Sergey Brazovsky, Konstantin Efetov, David Khmel'nitsky, Vladimir Mineev, Grigory Volovik, Paul Wiegmann, Leonid Levitov, Alexander Zamolodchikov, Vadim Knizhnik, Konstantin Khanin, and Yakov G. Sinai.

Fields of Research
The main fields of research are:

 Mathematical physics
 Computational physics 
 Nonlinear dynamics 
 Condensed matter theory
 Nuclear and elementary particle physics 
 Quantum field theory

References

External links
Institute's web site (English version)
Talk by Vinay Ambegaokar on the history of the Landau school

Further reading
Isaak Markovich Khalatnikov and Vladimir P. Mineev (eds.), 30 years of the Landau Institute- selected papers (World Scientific, 1996)

1965 establishments in the Soviet Union
Institutes of the Russian Academy of Sciences
Research institutes in the Soviet Union
Physics institutes
Nuclear research institutes in Russia
Theoretical physics institutes